Linda Jane Seemeyer (born 1949) is an American health care administrator and politician. She served as the Wisconsin Secretary of Health Services under Governor Scott Walker starting in August 2016.

Previously, Seemeyer had served as Deputy Secretary of the Wisconsin Department of Administration under Governor of Wisconsin Tommy Thompson and later as the Director of the Milwaukee County Department of Administrative Services under then-County Executive Scott Walker. She served as Director of the Walworth County Department of Health & Human Services from 2007 to 2015.

References

1949 births
Living people
Politicians from Milwaukee
State cabinet secretaries of Wisconsin
Place of birth missing (living people)
Wisconsin Republicans
Women in Wisconsin politics
21st-century American politicians
21st-century American women politicians